Trachyderes is a genus of beetles in the family Cerambycidae, containing the following species:

 Trachyderes armatus Monne & Martins, 1973
 Trachyderes badius Dupont, 1840
 Trachyderes cauaburi Huedepohl, 1985
 Trachyderes cingulatus Klug, 1825
 Trachyderes distinctus Bosq, 1951
 Trachyderes elegans Dupont, 1836
 Trachyderes hermani Huedepohl, 1985
 Trachyderes hilaris Bates, 1880
 Trachyderes latecinctus Martins, 1975
 Trachyderes leptomerus Aurivillius, 1908
 Trachyderes melas Bates, 1870
 Trachyderes pacificus Huedepohl, 1985
 Trachyderes politus Bates, 1870
 Trachyderes succinctus (Linnaeus, 1758)

References

Trachyderini
Cerambycidae genera